And No One Could Save Her is a 1973 American TV film directed by Kevin Billington. It was shot in Dublin.

Cast
Lee Remick

Reception
The Los Angeles Times called it "the season's absolute worst made for television movie."

References

External links
And No One Could Save Her at IMDb

1973 television films
1973 films
ABC Movie of the Week
American mystery films
Films about missing people
Films directed by Kevin Billington
Films set in Dublin (city)
Films shot in the Republic of Ireland
1970s American films